This is a list of Brazilian television related events from 2011.

Events
29 March - Maria Melillo wins the eleventh season of Big Brother Brasil.
14 July - Henrique Lemes wins the sixth season of Ídolos.
4 September - 18-year-old actor Miguel Roncato and his partner Ana Flavia Simões win the eighth season of Dança dos Famosos.

Debuts

Television shows

1970s
Vila Sésamo (1972-1977, 2007–present)
Turma da Mônica (1976–present)

1990s
Malhação (1995–present)
Cocoricó (1996–present)

2000s
Big Brother Brasil (2002–present)
Dança dos Famosos (2005–present)
Ídolos (2006-2012)
Peixonauta (2009–present)

2010s
Meu Amigãozão (2010–present)

Ending this year

Births

Deaths

See also
2010 in Brazil
List of Brazilian films of 2010